United States gubernatorial elections were held on November 2, 1993, in two states and one territory, as well as other statewide offices and members of state legislatures.  Both seats were originally held by Democrats, but they switched parties following the elections.

Election results

States

Territory

Closest races 
States where the margin of victory was under 5%:
 New Jersey, 1.0%

Notes

References